Sir William Thomas Makins, 1st Baronet  (16 March 1840 – 2 February 1906) was a barrister and Conservative politician.

Makins was the eldest son of Charles Makins of St. Mark's, Woodhouse, Leeds. He was educated at Harrow School, and at Trinity College, Cambridge. He was called to the bar at Middle Temple in 1862 and went on the Midland Circuit. His directorships included the Great Eastern Railway, and the Gas Light and Coke Company. He was appointed Lieutenant-Colonel of the 3rd (Stratford) Essex Artillery Volunteer Corps in 1869 and was Honorary Colonel of the unit and its successors from 23 April 1874. He was also a J.P. for Oxfordshire and Essex, and a Deputy Lieutenant  for Essex and the City of London'

Makins  stood unsuccessfully for parliament at Kidderminster in 1868. In 1874 he was elected Member of Parliament for South Essex. He held the seat until the Redistribution of Seats Act 1885 when he was elected for South East Essex. In 1886, he was elected instead at Walthamstow  and held the seat until 1892. He was created baronet of Rotherfield Court,  Henley-on-Thames in 1902, as part of King Edward VII's Birthday Honours.

Makins died at the age of 65.

Makins married Elizabeth Simpson in 1861. Their daughter Mary married Sir Eugene Clauson, and their third son Paul succeeded to the baronetcy and became Lord Lieutenant of Oxfordshire.

References

External links 
 

1840 births
1906 deaths
Makins, Sir William, 1st Baronet
Conservative Party (UK) MPs for English constituencies
UK MPs 1874–1880
UK MPs 1880–1885
UK MPs 1885–1886
UK MPs 1886–1892
People educated at Harrow School
Deputy Lieutenants of Essex
Members of the Middle Temple
Deputy Lieutenants of the City of London
Alumni of Trinity College, Cambridge
Directors of the Great Eastern Railway
Members of the Parliament of the United Kingdom for South East Essex